The 2022 LSU Tigers football team represented Louisiana State University in the 2022 NCAA Division I FBS football season. The Tigers played their home games at Tiger Stadium in Baton Rouge, Louisiana, and competed in the Western Division of the Southeastern Conference (SEC). They were led by first-year head coach Brian Kelly.

The top-ranked recruit in LSU's 2022 recruiting class was linebacker Harold Perkins.

Previous season
The 2021 team finished 6–7, 3–5 in SEC play, finishing last in the SEC's West Division. Following a 49–42 victory over no. 20 Florida, it was announced that university administration and head coach Ed Orgeron had mutually agreed for Orgeron to step down following the season; the Tigers were 3–3 at the time of the announcement. Orgeron's final game as the Tigers' head coach was a 27–24 comeback victory against no. 15 Texas A&M, making the Tigers bowl eligible. Despite being bowl eligible, Orgeron announced that he would not coach in the team's bowl game; instead, offensive line coach Brad Davis served as the team's interim head coach. The Tigers were invited to the Texas Bowl, losing 20–42 to Kansas State.

On November 30, 2021, Notre Dame head coach Brian Kelly was named LSU's 33rd head coach. Cincinnati offensive coordinator/tight ends coach Mike Denbrock and Kansas City Chiefs linebackers coach Matt House were named as the Tigers' new offensive coordinator and defensive coordinator, respectively.

SEC media days
The 2022 SEC Media days were held in July 2022. The Preseason Polls were released in July 2022. Each team had their head coach available to talk to the media at the event. Coverage of the event was televised on SEC Network and ESPN.

Schedule
LSU and the SEC announced the 2022 football schedule on September 21, 2021.

Roster

Game summaries

vs. Florida State

Southern

Mississippi State

New Mexico

at Auburn

No. 8 Tennessee

at Florida

No. 7 Ole Miss

No. 6 Alabama

at Arkansas

UAB

at Texas A&M

vs. No. 1 Georgia (SEC Championship Game)

vs. Purdue (Citrus Bowl)

LSU set new Citrus Bowl records for most points scored (63), largest margin of victory (56), and total offensive yards (594).

Rankings

References

LSU
LSU Tigers football seasons
Citrus Bowl champion seasons
LSU Tigers football